The Belmont Cricket Club was one of four chief cricket clubs in Philadelphia, Pennsylvania, that played from its 1874 founding in West Philadelphia until its disbanding in 1914. Bart King, arguably America's greatest cricketer during its 1890-1914 golden age, played for Belmont from 1893 to 1913. Another famous American cricketer, English-born Cecil Hurditch, played for Belmont in 1912 after he returned from playing for the Santa Monica Cricket Club in southern California.  In 1913, Hurditch introduced soccer to the club members.

See also
History of United States cricket#Philadelphian cricket
Philadelphia Cricket Club
Germantown Cricket Club
Merion Cricket Club

Notes

Cricket in Philadelphia
American club cricket teams
Cricket clubs established in 1874
1874 establishments in Pennsylvania
1914 disestablishments in Pennsylvania
Sports clubs disestablished in 1914